The Bonus Jack is a hamburger sold by the fast-food restaurant chain Jack in the Box. It was one of the company's signature products. The Bonus Jack was first offered in 1970 to compete with McDonald's Big Mac and was discontinued in the early 1980s. The Bonus Jack has been reintroduced to Jack in the Box menus at various times throughout the years.

Product description
Similar to the Big Mac, the Bonus Jack consists of two burger patties, American cheese, Jack's Secret Sauce, shredded lettuce, and two pickle slices on a three-piece bun.

See also
 List of sandwiches

References

Further reading

External links
 Bonus Jack
 Jack Brings Back Bonus Jack - Yahoo Finance
 News: Jack in the Box Brings Back the Bonus Jack | Brand Eating

Products introduced in 1970
Jack in the Box
Fast food hamburgers